is a railway station of the Chūō Main Line, East Japan Railway Company (JR East) in Anayama, in the city of Nirasaki, Yamanashi Prefecture, Japan.

Lines
Anayama Station is served by the Chūō Main Line, and is 154.7 kilometers from the terminus of the line at Tokyo Station.

Station layout
The station consists of one ground level island platform, connected to the station building by a footbridge. The station is unattended.

Platforms

History
Anayama Station opened on August 1, 1913, as a station on the Japanese Government Railways (JGR) Chūō Main Line. The JGR became the JNR (Japanese National Railways) after the end of World War II.  With the dissolution and privatization of the JNR on April 1, 1987, the station came under the control of the East Japan Railway Company. Automated turnstiles using the Suica IC Card system came into operation from October 16, 2004.

Passenger statistics
In fiscal 2010, the station was used by an average of 186 passengers daily (boarding passengers only).

Surrounding area
Kamanashi River
Japan National Route 20
 Anayama Post Office

See also
 List of railway stations in Japan

References

 Miyoshi Kozo. Chuo-sen Machi to eki Hyaku-niju nen. JT Publishing (2009)

External links
JR East Anayama Station

Railway stations in Yamanashi Prefecture
Railway stations in Japan opened in 1913
Chūō Main Line
Stations of East Japan Railway Company
Nirasaki, Yamanashi